This is a list of programs broadcast by the DuMont Television Network, which operated in the United States from 1942 to 1956. All regularly scheduled programs which were aired on the DuMont network are listed below, regardless of whether they originated at DuMont. Some DuMont network series were actually broadcast from Baltimore's WAAM-TV, Chicago's WGN-TV, Cincinnati's WCPO-TV, or Philadelphia's WFIL. These stations were not DuMont-owned stations but were affiliated with the network. Programs which aired on the DuMont network but originated from affiliate stations are noted in this list.

Some DuMont programs were produced by other networks but aired on DuMont. For example, Play the Game (1946) was produced by ABC, but aired on DuMont since ABC had no network until 1948. The Admiral Broadway Revue (1949) aired on both NBC and DuMont at the same time, as did Man Against Crime (1953). Pick the Winner (1952) aired on both CBS and DuMont. Some programs, such as Flash Gordon (1954) aired both in syndication and on DuMont. These exceptions are noted in the list.

Programs produced at DuMont facilities but which aired on other networks, such as CBS's The Honeymooners (1955), are not included in this list. Also not included in this list are the numerous local programs seen on individual DuMont stations, Paramount television series, and programs created by successor companies (DuMont Broadcasting Company, Metropolitan Broadcasting, Metromedia, and Fox Broadcasting Company). See those articles for programs produced or aired by those companies.

A timeline of DuMont network programs appears at the end of this list. For a list of surviving DuMont programs, see List of surviving DuMont Television Network broadcasts



Former Programming

Scripted

Drama 

Captain Video and His Video Rangers (1949–1955)
 Charlie Wild, Private Detective (1952) - moved from ABC
 Chicagoland Mystery Players (1947–1950) - moved from WGN-TV
 Crawford Mystery Theatre (1951–1952)
 Flash Gordon (1954–1955)
 Front Page Detective (1951–1952)
 Jimmy Hughes, Rookie Cop (May–July 1953)
 Major Dell Conway of the Flying Tigers (1951–1952)
 Man Against Crime (1953–1954) - moved from CBS, simulcast with NBC
 Not for Publication (1951–1952)
 Rocky King, Detective (1950–1954) - a.k.a. Inside Detective
 Shadow of the Cloak (1951–1952)
 Summer Night Theater (July 1953)
 The Adventures of Ellery Queen (1950–1951)
 The Cases of Eddie Drake (1952)
 The Gallery of Madame Liu-Tsong (Aug–Nov 1951)
 The O'Neills (Sept 1949–Jan 1950)
 The Plainclothesman (1949–1954)
 The Secret Files of Captain Video (Sept 1953–May 1954)
 The Stranger (1954–1955)
 This Is the Life (Sept 1952–Fall 1953)
 Tom Corbett, Space Cadet (1953–1954)

Sitcoms 

Colonel Humphrey Flack (1953–1954) - a.k.a. The Fabulous Fraud
 Easy Aces (Dec 1949–June 1950)
 It's a Business (March–May 1952)
 Marge and Jeff (1953–1954)
 Mary Kay and Johnny (1947–1948)
 Off the Record (October 1948)
 The Ernie Kovacs Show (Apr 1954–Apr 1955) - moved from CBS
The Family Genius (Sept 1949)
 The Goldbergs (Apr–Oct 1954) - moved from CBS
 The Growing Paynes (1948–1949)
 The Laytons (Aug–Oct 1948)
 The Morey Amsterdam Show (1949–1950) - moved from CBS

Anthology 

The Bigelow Theatre (1950–1951) - moved from CBS
 Cosmopolitan Theatre (Oct–Dec 1951)
 Dark of Night (1952–1953)
 Drama at Eight (July 1953)
 DuMont Royal Theater (1951–1952)
 Ethel Barrymore Theatre (Sept–Dec 1956)
 Frontier Theatre (May–Sept 1950)
 Gruen Playhouse (Jan–Aug 1952) - moved from ABC
 Hands of Murder (1949–1951) - a.k.a. Hands of Mystery and Hands of Destiny
 Joseph Schildkraut Presents (1953–1954)
 Love Story (April–June 1954)
 Night Editor (Mar–Sept 1954)
 Nine Thirty Curtain (1953–1954)
 One Man's Experience (1952–1953) - a.k.a. One Man's Story
 One Woman's Experience (1952–1953) - a.k.a. One Woman's Story
 Program Playhouse (June–Sept 1949)
 Pulse of the City (1953–1954)
 Rebound (Nov 1952–Jan 1953)) - moved from ABC
 Studio 57 (1954–1955) - a.k.a. Heinz Studio 57
 Your Story Theatre (Nov 1950–May 1951) - a.k.a. Story Theatre and Durkee Story Theatre

Soap Opera 

A Woman to Remember (Feb–July 1949)
 Faraway Hill (Oct–Dec 1946)
 Highway to the Stars (Aug–Oct 1947)

Children's Programming 

Adventure Playhouse (April–May 1950)
All About Baby (1953–1955)
Happy's Party (1952–1953)
 Johnny Jupiter (1953)
 Kids and Company (1951–1952)
 King Cole's Birthday Party (1948–1949) - a.k.a. Birthday Party
 Serving Through Science (1945–1947)
 Small Fry Club (1947–1951)
 The Adventures of Oky Doky (1948–1949)
 The Magic Cottage (1949–1952)
 The Roy Doty Show (May–Oct 1953)
 Your Television Babysitter (1948–1952)

Unscripted

Court Show 

Court of Current Issues (1948–1951)
 Famous Jury Trials (1949–1952)
 They Stand Accused (1949–1954)

Docuseries 

A Visit With the Armed Forces (1950–1951)
 Better Living TV Theater (1954)) - moved from ABC
 The Big Idea (1952–1953)
 Key to the Missing (1948–1949)

Fashion 

And Everything Nice (1949–1950)
 Fashions on Parade (1948–1949)

Game Show 

Battle of the Ages (Jan–July 1952)
 Bingo at Home (1956–58)
 Blind Date (1953) - moved from NBC
 Broadway to Hollywood (1949–1954) - a.k.a.Headline Clues
 Cash and Carry (1946–1947)
 Charade Quiz (1947–1949)
 Dollar a Second (1953–1954)
 Down You Go (1951–1955)
 Gamble on Love (July–Aug 1954)
 Have a Heart (May–June 1955)
 Hold That Camera (Aug–Dec 1950)
 Know Your New York (1947–1948)
 On Your Way (1953–1954)
 Pantomime Quiz (1953–1954) - moved from NBC
 Play the Game (Sept–Dec 1946)
 Quick on the Draw (Jan–Dec 1952)
 Spin the Picture (1949–1950)
 Talent Jackpot (July–Aug 1949)
 They're Off (July–Aug 1949)
 Time Will Tell (Aug–Oct 1954)
 Twenty Questions (1951–1954) - moved from ABC
 What's Your Bid? (May–July 1953) - moved from ABC

Music 

Amanda (November 1, 1948–1949)
Concert Tonight (1953–1955)
 Flight to Rhythm (Mar–Sept 1949) - a.k.a. The Delora Bueno Show
 Hotel Broadway (Jan–Mar 1949)
 It's Alec Templeton Time (June–Aug 1955)
 Jazz Party (1958)
 Music From Chicago (April–June 1951)
 The Music Show (1953–1954)
 Old American Barn Dance (July–Sept 1953)
 Opera Cameos (1953–1955)
 Rhythm Rodeo (1950–1951)
 Teen Time Tunes (Mar–July 1949)
 The Hazel Scott Show (1950)
 The Stan Shaw Show (1948–49)
 The Susan Raye Show (1950)
 The Vincent Lopez Show (1949–1951)
 This Is Music (1951–1952)
 Windy City Jamboree (March–June 1950)

News and Public Affairs 

Camera Headlines (1948–1949)
 DuMont Evening News (1954–1955)
 I.N.S. Telenews (1948–1949)
 Keep Posted (1951–1954) - a.k.a. The Big Issue
 Meet the Boss (June 1952–May 1953)
 Meet Your Congress (1953–1954) - moved from NBC
 New York Times Youth Forum (1952–1953)
 News Gal (1951)
 Newsweek Views the News (1948–1950) - a.k.a. Newsweek Analysis
 Operation Information (July–Sept 1952)
 Operation Success (1948–1949)
 Our Secret Weapon: The Truth (1950–1951)
 Pentagon (1951–1952) - a.k.a. Pentagon Washington 
 Pick the Winner (Aug–Nov 1952) - simulcast with CBS
 The Drew Pearson Show (1952–1953) - moved from ABC
 The Power of Women (July–Nov 1952)
 The Walter Compton News (June 1947–1948)
 Washington Exclusive (June–November 1953)
 Washington Report (May–August 1951)
 Time for Reflection (1950–1951)
 Your School Reporter (1948–1952)

Panel Show 

Ladies Before Gentlemen (Feb–May 1951)
 Life Begins at Eighty (1952–1955) - moved from NBC
 One Minute Please (1954–1955)
 Photographic Horizons (Jan–Mar 1949)
 Report Card for Parents (Dec 1952–Feb 1953)
 What's the Story? (1951–September 23, 1955)
 Where Was I? (1952–1953)
 Wisdom of the Ages (1952–1953)
 With This Ring (Jan–Mar 1951)

Religious 

Elder Michaux (Oct 1948–Jan 1949) - moved from WTTG
 Life Is Worth Living (1952–1955)
 The Week in Religion (1952–1954)
 Youth on the March (1952–1953) - moved from ABC

Sports 

 Amateur Boxing Fight Club (1949–1950)

 Bowling Headliners (1949–1950) - moved from ABC
 Boxing From Eastern Parkway (1952–1954)
 Boxing From Jamaica Arena (1948–1949)
 Boxing From St. Nicholas Arena (1954–August 6, 1956) - moved from NBC
 Boxing From Sunnyside Gardens (1949–1950)
 Famous Fights From Madison Square Garden (Sept–Dec 1952)
 Fishing and Hunting Club (1949–1950) - a.k.a. Sports for All
 Football Sidelines (Oct–Dec 1952)
 Football This Week (Oct–Dec 1951)
 Golf Instruction with Phil Galvano (1952–1954)
 NBA on DuMont (1953–54)
 NFL on DuMont (1951–1955)
 Pro Football Highlights (Oct 1951–Dec 1952) - moved from ABC
 Saturday Night at the Garden (1950–1951)
 Scoreboard (14 April 1948 – 22 April 1949) - a.k.a. Russ Hodges' Scoreboard
 Swing Into Sports (1948)
 Wrestling From Columbia Park Arena (1948)
 Wrestling From Jamaica Arena (1948)
 Wrestling From Marigold (1949–1955)
 Wrestling From Sunnyside Gardens (1949)

Talent Show 

Chance of a Lifetime (1953–1955) - moved from ABC
 Doorway to Fame (1947–1949)
 Stage a Number (1952–1953)
 The Original Amateur Hour (January 18, 1948–September 25, 1949)
 The Talent Shop (1951–1952)

Talk Show 

At Home With Billie Burke (June 1951–Spring 1952)
 Author Meets the Critics (1952–1954) - moved from ABC
 Eloise Salutes the Stars (1950–1951)
 Georgetown University Forum (1951–1953)
 Jacqueline Susann's Open Door (1951)
 Manhattan Spotlight (1949–1951)
 The Igor Cassini Show (Oct 1953–Feb 1954)
 The Wendy Barrie Show (Jan–July 1949) - moved from ABC

Variety Show 

The Al Morgan Show (1949–1951)
Admiral Broadway Revue (January–June 1949) - simulcast with NBC
 Café de Paris (1949)
 Cavalcade of Bands (1950–1951)
 Cavalcade of Stars (1949–1951)
 Champagne and Orchids (1948–1949)
 Chez Paree Revue (1950)
 Cinema Varieties (Sept–Nov 1949)
 Country Style (July–Nov 1950)
 Dinner Date (Jan–July 1950)
 The Dotty Mack Show (1953) - a.k.a. Girl Alone
 Front Row Center (1949–1950)
 Guide Right (1952–1954)
 Johnny Olson's Rumpus Room (1949–1952)
 Ladies' Date (1952–1953)
 Look Upon a Star (1947)
 Monodrama Theater (May 1952–December 7, 1953)
 Okay, Mother (1949–1951) - moved from WABD
 On Stage, Everybody (1945)
 Once Upon a Tune (March–May 1951)
 Playroom (Jan–May 1948)
 Stage Entrance (1951–1952)
 Star Time (Sept. 1950–March 1951)
 Starlit Time (April 1950–November 1950)
 Stars on Parade (1953–1954)
 The Alan Dale Show (1948)
 The Arthur Murray Party (1950–1951; 1952–1953) - moved from ABC
 The Ilona Massey Show (Nov 1954–Jan 1955)
 The Joan Edwards Show (1950)
 The Most Important People (1950–1951) - a.k.a. Mr. and Mrs. Carroll
 The Paul Dixon Show (1952–1955)
 The Ted Steele Show (1949) - moved from NBC
 The School House (Jan–Apr 1949)
 The Strawhatters (1953–1954)
 Window on the World (Jan–Apr 1949)

Unknown Genre 
 The Armed Forces Hour (1949–1951) - moved from NBC
 The Face of the War (June 1942–1945)
 Feature Theatre (March 1949–August 1950)
 Guess What? (Jul–Aug 1952)
 Hollywood Preview (Sept 1955–June 1956)
 International Playhouse (May–Nov 1951)
 It's a Small World (June–July 1953)
 The Jack Eigen Show (1947–1951)
 The Johns Hopkins Science Review (1950–1954) - moved from CBS
 Key to the Ages (Feb–May 1955)
 Melody Street (1953–1954)
 Mystery Theater (1949–1950) - a.k.a. DuMont Mystery Theater
 The Needle Shop (1948–49)
 The Pet Shop (1951–1953)
 Screen Mystery (Apr–Oct 1950)
 Steve Randall (7 Nov. 1952 – 30 Jan. 1953) - a.k.a. Hollywood Off Beat
 Take the Break (2 July 1951–1953)
 Thrills and Chills from Everywhere (June 1942–June 1946)
 Trash or Treasure (1952–1953) - a.k.a.Treasure Hunt
 TV Department Store (January 1949)
 TV Shopper (Nov 1948–Dec 1950) - a.k.a. Your TV Shopper and The Kathi Norris Show
 The Twinkle in Your Eye (1950)
 Western Movie (1946–1947)
 You Asked for It (1950–1951)
 Your Victory Garden (1943)

Specials / Events / One-Off Broadcasts 

 Talk Fast, Mister (December 18, 1944) - one-hour drama filmed by RKO Radio Pictures
 Don McNeill's Breakfast Club (May 12, 1948) - kinescope, simulcast with ABC Radio

 A Christmas Carol (December 25, 1947)
 Coaxial Cable Opening (January 11, 1949)
 Miss U.S. Television Grand Finals (September 30, 1950)
 Top 12 Business Leaders (May 28, 1951) - 30-minute special from the 21 Club in NYC
 Passaic: Birthplace of Television and the DuMont Story (November 14, 1951) - 15-minute special
 Adlai Stevenson Speech From Salt Lake City (14 October 1952) - telecast of a speech by presidential candidate Adlai Stevenson
 General Foods 25th Anniversary Show: A Salute to Rodgers and Hammerstein (28 March 1954) - Two-hour special, aired on all four TV networks
 Army-McCarthy Hearings (April 22 – June 17, 1954) - simulcast with ABC
 Light's Diamond Jubilee (24 October 1954) - Two-hour special sponsored by General Electric, aired on all four TV networks
 A.N.T.A. Album of 1955 (28 March 1955) - closed circuit fundraising appeal sponsored by American National Theater and Academy (ANTA) and CARE)

Timeline of programs

References

External links
 DuMont Television Network Historical Web site -Programs
 List of DuMont Television Network programs at IMDB
 List of DuMont Television shows at CTVA
 America’s First Sitcom and Other Forgotten Comedies on DuMont, the Lost Network

 
DuMont